David P. Harmon (September 3, 1918 in Buffalo – August 28, 2001 in Los Angeles) was an American scenarist and producer.

Biography 

Wife: Ruth Dubin Harmon; b. 1918; d. 1987

Filmography

Films

Television

External links
 

American film producers
1918 births
2001 deaths
20th-century American screenwriters